"Tough Enough" is the debut single of the Estonian girl band Vanilla Ninja. The music was composed by David Brandes and Petra Brändle (under the pseudonym Jane Tempest), with lyrics by Bernd Meinunger (as John O'Flynn).

"Tough Enough" was released on November 24, 2003, and entered the charts, reaching number 11 in Finland, 13 in Germany, 16 in Austria and 52 in Switzerland. The song features on the albums Traces of Sadness, Limited Edition and Best Of. The video, by Mathias Vielsäcker and Christoph Mangler, was shot in November 2003.

The song appeared in the 2004 video games Dancing Stage Fusion, Dance Dance Revolution Ultramix 2 and In the Groove.

Charts

Track listing
"Tough Enough" (Single version) – 3:24
"Tough Enough" (Ambient mix) – 3:24
"Tough Enough" (Extended version) – 6:24
"Tough Enough" (Unplugged version) – 3:24
"Tough Enough" (Musicvideo) – 3:24

References

Songs written by David Brandes
Songs written by Bernd Meinunger
2003 singles
2003 songs